Events in the year 1299 in Norway.

Incumbents
Monarch: Eric II Magnusson then Haakon V Magnusson

Events

Arts and literature

Births

Deaths
13 July – Eric II of Norway, King (born c. 1268).

References

Norway